Legislative elections were held in South Korea on 12 February 1985. The result was a victory for the Democratic Justice Party, which won 148 of the 276 seats in the National Assembly. Voter turnout was 84.6%.

Political parties

The ruling Democratic Justice Party (DJP) of President Chun Doo-hwan managed to remain the largest party in the National Assembly but faced a tougher challenge from the united opposition.

The New Korean Democratic Party (NKDP) was formed by former members of the New Democratic Party, notably opposition leaders Kim Dae-jung and Kim Young-sam despite being still barred from running. The party made strong gains across the country, largely thanks to its focus on greater democratic rights.

The Korean National Party had been formed by former members of the Democratic Republican Party in the run-up to the 1981 elections. After making some key gains, the party lost ground in these elections, largely thanks to the gains of the NKDP.

The opposition Democratic Korea Party had been the premier opposition party following the 1981 elections, but it suffered major defections to the NKDP.

Results

By city/province

Notes

References

Republic of Korea Historical Archive of Parliamentary Elections Results

Legislative elections in South Korea
South Korea
Legislative